Ciarán McMenamin (born 1 October 1975) is a Northern Irish actor and author.

Early life
McMenamin was born in Enniskillen, County Fermanagh, Northern Ireland, where he attended St Michael's College. He earned his B.A. from the Royal Scottish Academy of Music and Drama in 1998. He attended drama classes at Ardhowen Youth Theatre before moving on to work with the Ulster Youth Theatre.

Career
McMenamin has appeared on various BBC and ITV programmes, including "4:50 From Paddington", an episode of Agatha Christie's Marple, starring Geraldine McEwan, in which he played Cedric Crackenthorpe, and in the Channel 4 comedy series The Young Person's Guide To Becoming A Rock Star. In 1999 he was cast in the title role of the BBC1 television movie David Copperfield. He co-starred in The Golden Hour (ITV, 2005), playing a doctor.

In January 2009, he appeared in a one-off special episode ("The Grinning Man") of the BBC's Jonathan Creek, playing a grounds keeper. He co-starred in the 2001 movie To End All Wars. In 2008, he played the lead role in The Last Confession of Alexander Pearce. In 2011, he played the role of Matt Anderson on the science fiction television programme Primeval.

In 2012 he played leading fireman Frederick Barrett in the docudrama Saving The Titanic.

Books
McMenamin's debut novel Skintown was published 15 May 2018. Skintown (sobriquet for McMenamin's home town of Enniskillen) was compared to Irvine Welsh's cult Transpotting novel.

McMenamin's second book The Sunken Road was published 18 February 2021.

Personal life
In 2017, he married English actress Annabel Scholey.

Filmography

References

External links
 
 

Living people
People from Enniskillen
Male film actors from Northern Ireland
Male television actors from Northern Ireland
1975 births
People educated at St Michael's College, Enniskillen